Eglė Karpavičiūtė (born 1984) is a Lithuanian painter.

Biography

Work

Awards 

 2015: Donkey Art Prize, Milan, Italy
 2015: Premio Combat Prize, Livorno, Italy

Shows 

 2010: Science Fiction. Retrospective, Old Town art gallery/studio, Vilnius
 2012: Imagoscopia, Pramantha Arte, Lamezia Terme, Italy

References 

1984 births
Living people
Lithuanian painters
Vilnius Academy of Arts alumni